The discography of the South Korean girl group, Secret, consists of two studio albums, six mini albums, sixteen singles, twenty music videos, and one soundtrack.

In 2009, Secret released their debut single, "I Want You Back". In 2010, they released two EPs: Secret Time and Madonna. In 2011, they released two singles, "Shy Boy" and Starlight Moonlight. In the same year, Secret also made their Japanese debut with their first single, "Madonna". They then released their first full-length Korean studio album, Moving in Secret, in October 2011. A month later, the group released their first Japanese EP, Shy Boy. In 2012, the group released two Japanese singles, "So Much For Goodbye" and "Twinkle Twinkle", prior to releasing their first full-length Japanese album, "Welcome to Secret Time". In September 2012, Secret released their third Korean EP, Poison, followed by their second digital single, "Talk That", in December 2012. In 2013, they released their fourth EP, Letter from Secret, and one single album, Gift From Secret. In 2014, they released two Japanese singles which were Japanese versions of "I Do I Do" and "YooHoo". Later that year, their fifth EP, Secret Summer, was released.

Albums

Studio albums

Extended plays

Singles

Other charted songs

Soundtracks

Music videos

See also
Secret videography
List of songs by Secret
List of awards and nominations received by Secret

References

External links

Discographies of South Korean artists
K-pop music group discographies
Discography